N2O, subtitled as Nitrous Oxide in North America, is a 1998 tube shooter for the PlayStation, featuring a soundtrack composed by the American electronic music duo The Crystal Method. The soundtrack was heavily used to promote the game, and the music is stored in Red Book format meaning the game disc can be played as a music CD on an ordinary CD player.

Plot

Gameplay
N2O is a tube shooter in which the player shoots insects while collecting "E" coins, mushroom shields, and other psychedelically-themed weapon power-ups. As more insects are shot, the game increases speed. Players can collect more points by killing enemies in certain ways (such as shooting centipedes in the head) and by shooting the coins which appear when an enemy is killed to increase its value. Coins can be used to purchase shields, firewall powerups, and points at the end of each level. Besides the single player mode, N2O features a cooperative multiplayer mode with a shared screen or a split screen.

Development
Producer Peter Dalton said that "We set out to create a game where the gameplay was simple on one level but completely absorbing and addictive on another."

The soundtrack was not added until the end of development, since publisher Fox Interactive wanted to sign a high profile techno band for the game's music.

Reception

The game received average reviews according to the review aggregation website GameRankings. Next Generation said, "shooter fans who thrive on the ability to top their last high score time and time again won't be disappointed by this high energy blast-a-thon." The New York Times praised N2O for its aesthetics and smoothly seamless but fast-paced gameplay. They said that the game is similar in presentation to a Crystal Method concert and that the game is best played at high volume and in total darkness to maximize the audiovisual experience, and further remarked that the superior audio capacities of televisions (especially those attached to home theater systems) over typical computer systems is one of the advantages to restricting the game to the console market and not releasing it as a PC game.

The game shipped more than 100,000 copies.

Ports and re-releases
N2O was re-released for PlayStation Network by Urbanscan in PAL regions on January 10, 2008, and by Sony Interactive Entertainment in North America on June 1, 2010; and Latin America on August 13, 2013. Console Classics released the game under license of Urbanscan for Microsoft Windows via Steam on June 29, 2015, emulated through PCSXR.

Notes

References

External links

1998 soundtrack albums
1998 video games
Fixed shooters
Gremlin Interactive games
PlayStation (console) games
PlayStation Network games
Rail shooters
The Crystal Method albums
Fox Interactive games
Sony Interactive Entertainment games
Video game soundtracks
Video games about insects
Video games developed in the United Kingdom
Multiplayer and single-player video games
Cooperative video games